Pecluvirus is a genus of viruses, in the family Virgaviridae. Cereal crops and graminaceous weeds serve as natural hosts. There are two species in this genus. Diseases associated with this genus include: (SBWMV): green and yellow mosaic. The name of the genus is derived from Peanut clump virus: Peanut clump virus, giving rise to Pecluvirus.

Taxonomy
The following two species are assigned to the genus:
 Indian peanut clump virus
 Peanut clump virus

Structure
Viruses in the genus Pecluvirus are non-enveloped, with elongated rod-shaped geometries, and helical symmetry. The diameter is around 21 nm, with a length of 245 nm. Genomes are linear and segmented, segments are about 5.9 and 4.8kb in length.

Life cycle
Viral replication is cytoplasmic. Entry into the host cell is achieved by penetration into the host cell. Replication follows the positive stranded RNA virus replication model. Positive stranded RNA virus transcription is the method of transcription. Translation takes place by leaky scanning, and  suppression of termination. The virus exits the host cell by tripartite non-tubule guided viral movement. Cereal crops and graminaceous weeds serve as the natural host. The virus is transmitted via a vector (fungus). Transmission routes are vector and seed borne.

References

External links
 ICTV 10th Report Virgaviridae
 Viralzone: Pecluvirus
 ICTV

Virgaviridae
Virus genera